The 2005–06 Armenian Hockey League season was the fifth season of the Armenian Hockey League, the top level of ice hockey in Armenia. Five teams participated in the league, and Urartu Yerevan won the championship.

Standings

External links
 Season on SFRP's Hockey Archive

Armenian Hockey League
2005 in Armenian sport
2006 in Armenian sport
Armenian Hockey League seasons